Charles Francis Malay (June 13, 1879 in Brooklyn, New York – September 18, 1949 in Brooklyn, New York), was a professional baseball player who played second base for the 1905 Brooklyn Superbas. His son, Joe Malay, also played professional baseball.

External links

1879 births
1905 deaths
Major League Baseball second basemen
Brooklyn Superbas players
Baseball players from New York (state)
Sportspeople from Brooklyn
Baseball players from New York City
Fort Wayne Railroaders players
Amsterdam-Gloversville-Johnstown Jags players
Amsterdam-Gloversville-Johnstown Hyphens players
Newark Sailors players
Rochester Bronchos players
Elmira Colonels players
Danbury Hatters players
Montreal Royals players
Reading (baseball) players
Burials at Holy Cross Cemetery, Brooklyn